Moiseyevskaya is a rural locality (a village) in Verkhovskoye Rural Settlement, Verkhovazhsky District, Vologda Oblast, Russia. The population was 3 as of 2002.

Geography 
The distance to Verkhovazhye is 33.5 km, to Smetanino is 1.5 km. Skulinskaya, Kudrino, Novaya Derevnya are the nearest rural localities.

References 

Rural localities in Verkhovazhsky District